Memorialization generally refers to the process of preserving memories of people or events. It can be a form of address or petition, or a ceremony of remembrance or commemoration.

Memorialization as a human right
Memorialization is a universal need for both those being memorialized and those who are grieving. Although historically it was limited to the elite and only practiced in the highest societal classes, it is now almost considered a fundamental human right for all people.

Memorialization and transitional justice
In the context of transitional justice, memorialization is used to honor the victims of  human rights abuses.   Memorials can help governments reconcile tensions with victims by demonstrating respect and acknowledging the past. They can also help to establish a record of history, and to  prevent the recurrence of abuse.

Memorials can also be serious social and political forces in democracy-building efforts.

Memorials are also a form of reparations, or compensation efforts that seek to address past human rights violations. They aim to provide compensation for losses endured by victims of abuse, and remedy prior wrongdoing. They also publicly recognize that victims are entitled to redress and respect. The United Nations Basic Principles on the Right to a Remedy and Reparation  recognizes “commemorations and tributes to the victims” as a form of reparation.

There are numerous  types of memorials used as transitional justice initiatives. These include architectural memorials, museums, and other commemorative events.  For instance, in northern Uganda, monuments, annual prayer ceremonies, and a mass grave were created in response to the war conducted by and against the Lord’s Resistance Army there.

Another example is the Museum of Memory and Human Rights in Chile, which was created to document abuses by the former military dictatorship there.

Challenges of memorialization
Memorialization can arouse controversy and present certain risks. In unstable political situations, memorials may increase desire for revenge and catalyze further violence. They are highly politicized processes that represent the will of those in power. They are thus difficult to shape, and international relief workers, peacekeepers, and NGOs risk being drawn into disputes about the creation or maintenance of memorial sites. Yet they also have the potential to redress historical grievances and enable societies to progress.

Guy Beiner has introduced a concept of decommemorating in reference to hostility towards acts of commemoration that can result in violent assaults and in iconoclastic defacement or destruction of monuments. Beiner's studies suggest that rather than stamping out memorialization, decommemorating can paradoxically, function as a form of ambiguous remembrance, sustaining interest in controversial memorials. Destruction of monuments can also trigger renewed acts of memorialization (which Beiner labelled "re-commemorating").

See also
 Cenotaph
 Moment of silence
 Mortuary roll
 Truth-seeking
 Transitional Justice
 Transitional Justice Institute
 Reparations (transitional justice)
 Holocaust Memorial Days
 Yom HaShoah (Holocaust and Heroism Remembrance Day) Israel
 National Day of Commemoration (Ireland)
 Commemoration of Husayn ibn Ali
 Khojaly Massacre Commemoration Day
 Commemorations of the Mountain Meadows massacre
 International Commemoration Day for Dead and Injured
 Gettysburg Rostrum (Battlefield venue for historical commemorations)
 Crime Victims' Rights Week Annual United States commemoration that promotes victims' rights and services.
 Maaveerar Day or Heroes' Day. Commemoration observed by Tamil people  to remember the deaths of militants.
 Sacred Defence Week Iranian annual commemoration of the 1980-1988 Iran-Iraq war.
 Bataan Memorial Death March Annual commemoration of the Bataan Death March.

Further reading
 Tobie S. Meyer-Fong. What Remains: Coming to Terms with Civil War in 19th Century China. (Stanford, CA: Stanford University Press,  2013).   . A study of the Taiping rebellion in mid 19th century China: its victims, their experience of the war, and the memorialization of the war.
 Report of the Special Rapporteur in the field of cultural rights, Farida Shaheed Memorialization processes http://www.ohchr.org/Documents/Issues/CulturalRights/A-HRC-25-49_en.pdf 
Louis Bickford, “Memoryworks/memory works”, in Transitional Justice, Culture and Society: Beyond Outreach, Clara Ramírez-Barat, ed. (New York, Social Science Research Council, 2014): https://s3.amazonaws.com/ssrc-cdn1/crmuploads/new_publication_3/%7B222A3D3D-C177-E311-A360-001CC477EC84%7D.pdf

References

External links
 International Center for Transitional Justice, Truth and Memory page

Human rights
Memorials by commemoration
Memory
Reparations
Transitional justice